The 2015 Piala Tun Sharifah Rodziah is the 28th edition of Piala Tun Sharifah Rodziah a women's football tournament organised by Football Association of Malaysia. Slinger was the host and it took place in the Universiti Kebangsaan Malaysia and Institut Latihan Kehakiman & Perundangan (ILKAP), Bandar Baru Bangi, Selangor. MISC-MIFA defeated Sabah the defending champions in the final by penalty shoot-out to win their first Piala Tun Sharifah Rodziah title.

Groups

Group A

Group B

Champions

References

External links
 Official website

Football cup competitions in Malaysia
Women's football in Malaysia